Cualac  is a town and seat of the municipality of Cualac, in the state of Guerrero, south-western Mexico. 
Cualac means Lugar de agua buena which translates into place of good water.
According to the 2012 census its population was 7,007.

References

Populated places in Guerrero